Anoche (Spanish for "last night") may refer to:

 Anoche, a 2005 studio album by Babasónicos
 "Anoche", a song by Arca from Arca
 "Anoche", a song by Rauw Alejandro

See also